Dolichopus plumipes is a species of fly in the family Dolichopodidae. It is found in most of North America, except for the eastern United States, and most of northern Europe and Asia.

References

External links
Images representing Dolichopus at BOLD

plumipes
Insects described in 1763
Asilomorph flies of Europe
Diptera of Asia
Diptera of North America
Taxa named by Giovanni Antonio Scopoli